Dar Derafsh-e Ebrahim Beygi (also Romanized as Dār Derafsh-e Ebrāhīm Beygī) is a village in Baladarband Rural District, in the Central District of Kermanshah County, Kermanshah Province, Iran. At the 2006 census, its population was 130, in 25 families.

References 

Populated places in Kermanshah County